Lee Ann Womack Liddell (born August 19, 1966) is an American country music singer. Her 2000 single, "I Hope You Dance" was a major crossover music hit, reaching No. 1 on the Billboard Country Chart and the Top 15 of the Billboard Hot 100, becoming her signature song.

When Womack emerged as a contemporary country artist in 1997, her material drew critical comparisons to Dolly Parton and Tammy Wynette, except for the way Womack's music mixed an old-fashioned style with contemporary elements. Her 2000 album I Hope You Dance had an entirely different sound, using pop music elements instead of traditional country. It was not until the release of There's More Where That Came From in 2005 that Womack returned to recording traditional country music. After a hiatus in 2008, Womack returned in 2014 with a new album (The Way I'm Livin') and a new sound which blended country and Americana.

Womack has released a total of nine studio albums and two compilations. Four of her studio albums have received a Gold certification or higher by the Recording Industry Association of America. Additionally, she has received five Academy of Country Music Awards, six Country Music Association Awards, and a Grammy Award. She has sold over 6 million albums worldwide. Womack is married to record producer Frank Liddell, and was previously married to songwriter and musician Jason Sellers; her daughter with the latter, Aubrie Sellers, is also a country music artist.

Early life
Lee Ann Womack was born on August 19, 1966 in Jacksonville, Texas. At an early age she was interested in country music. Her father, a disc jockey, often took his daughter to work with him to help choose records to play on the air. Womack was the second of two daughters. Her mother was a schoolteacher and her father was a high school principal. As a child, Womack studied the piano and later graduated from Jacksonville High School in 1984. After graduating, Womack attended South Plains Junior College in Levelland, Texas. The college was one of the first in the nation to offer country music degrees, and soon she became a member of the college band, Country Caravan. A year later, she left the college and after an agreement with her parents, Womack enrolled at Belmont University in Nashville, Tennessee, where she studied the commercial aspect of the music business. In Nashville, she interned at the A&R department of MCA Records. She studied at the college until 1990, leaving the school a year before graduation.

Womack spent a few years raising her children before reentering the music business in the mid 1990s. In 1995 she began performing her music in songwriting demos and at showcase concerts. At one of these showcase concerts, she was spotted by Tree Publishing, who signed her after listening to one of her original demo recordings. Womack wrote songs with some popular Nashville songwriters, including Bill Anderson and Ricky Skaggs, who recorded her composition, "I Don't Remember Forgetting" for one of his albums. After divorcing her first husband around that time, Womack decided to pursue a career as a country music artist. She auditioned for MCA chairman, Bruce Hinton, who praised her talents. Shortly afterward, she accepted a contract from MCA's sister record company, Decca Nashville in 1996.

Music career

Country music stardom: 1997–1999
Womack released her self-titled debut album in May 1997, produced by Mark Wright. The album consisted of self-penned material as well as songs written by other artists, including Mark Chesnutt, Ricky Skaggs, and Sharon White. The first single, "Never Again, Again" made the country charts and playlists by March 1997, which led to the release of the album's second single, "The Fool" shortly afterward. More successful than her first single, "The Fool" reached the Top 5 on the Billboard Country chart that year. That year she won major awards from the country music community; Top New Female Vocalist from the Academy of Country Music Awards, Top Artist of the Year from Billboard Magazine, and was nominated for the Horizon award by the Country Music Association. Decca Nashville decided to close its doors in 1998, moving Womack to MCA Nashville Records that year.

In 1998, Womack released her second studio album, Some Things I Know, which was also produced by Wright.
The album's first two singles, "A Little Past Little Rock" and "I'll Think of a Reason Later" both went to No. 2 on the Billboard Country Chart. Two additional singles, "(Now You See Me) Now You Don't" and "Don't Tell Me" were released in 1999, and the album was certified Gold by the RIAA soon after.

That year, she also won Favorite Country New Artist from the American Music Awards. Womack also contributed her vocals to the songs "If You're Ever Down in Dallas" and "The Man Who Made Mama Cry" in collaboration with her ex-husband and musician, Jason Sellers. The material was promoted through shows through October to November before the birth of Womack's second child in January 1999.

Pop crossover success: 2000–2004
Womack released her third studio album in 2000 entitled I Hope You Dance which met with major success. The title track (which was released as the lead single), reached No. 1 on the Billboard Country chart for five weeks and crossed over to the Billboard Hot 100, becoming a major crossover Pop hit, reaching No. 14. It also peaked at the top spot on the adult contemporary chart and even reached the UK Singles Charts, peaking at No. 40. Both of Womack's daughters appeared in the song's accompanying video. Towards the end of 2000, "I Hope You Dance" won the Country Music Association's "Song of the Year" and "Single of the Year" awards. With the Pop success of "I Hope You Dance," Womack drew the attention of the magazines People and Time, both of which praised the single, calling it "one of her best." The song later won awards in 2001 from the Grammy and Academy of Country music awards. The album of the same name has sold 3 million copies in the United States to date. The album's follow-up single, a cover of Rodney Crowell's "Ashes by Now" peaked at No. 4 on the Billboard Country Chart. The third single, "Why They Call it Falling" was also successful, reaching the country Top 15.

On December 11, 2000, Womack performed "I Hope You Dance" at the annual Nobel Peace Prize concert.

In 2002, Womack's fourth studio album, Something Worth Leaving Behind was released. The album made a stronger attempt at a pop-flavored style, however it did not react well, leading to poor record sales and only one major hit. Following its release, Womack's career stalled. Later that year, she released a Christmas album, The Season for Romance and also collaborated with Willie Nelson on his single, "Mendocino County Line," which won a Grammy and Country Music award in 2002. In early 2003, she got a small recurring role on the popular CBS drama The District.

In 2003, Womack sang the theme music for the PBS's animated TV series adaptation of The Berenstain Bears.

In 2004, Womack performed "I Hope You Dance" at the Republican National Convention, in which George W. Bush was nominated for his second term as President of the United States. The other performers that night included Sara Evans and Larry Gatlin. She also collaborated with Red Dirt Music band Cross Canadian Ragweed on their hit "Sick and Tired" in 2004. Also that year, she also released her first Greatest Hits album, which included two new songs; "The Wrong Girl" (the only song from the album released as a single) and "Time for Me to Go."

There's More Where That Came From and hiatus: 2005–2008

In 2005, she released her fifth studio album aimed at traditional country music entitled There's More Where That Came From.
Many people in the music industry called the album, "a return to tradition," featuring songs about drinking and cheating with a distinctive older country twang, mixing strings and steel guitar. The album won the Country Music Association's "Album of the Year" award in 2005.<ref name="book">{{cite book|title=Will the Circle Be Unbroken: Country Music in America|editor=Alanna Nash and Paul Kingsbury|publisher=DK Publishing, Inc|location=New York, NY|year=2006|page=349|chapter=Ch. 12: Pocketful of Gold}}</ref> Womack took inspiration from the records of the 1960s and 1970s, and according to Allmusic, the album sounded like albums by Loretta Lynn, Barbara Mandrell, and Dolly Parton from the 1970s. They also called it one of her best records. The lead single, "I May Hate Myself in the Morning" was a Top 10 hit in 2005, and also won "Single of the Year" by the CMA awards later that year. Two additional singles were released from the album in 2005 that became minor hits, "He Oughta Know That by Now" and "Twenty Years and Two Husbands Ago."  The album was released on vinyl LP as well as CD.

Womack can be heard on the track "If I Could Only Fly" from Joe Nichols' album Real Things. Womack has also appeared on specials on the CMT network, including their "100 Greatest Duets", which featured Womack singing a duet with Kenny Rogers, "Every Time Two Fools Collide". The song had been originally recorded by Rogers and Dottie West in 1978 and was a No. 1 Country hit that year. Womack took the place of West during that show since West had died in a serious car accident in September 1991. Womack's other honors includes being listed at No. 17 on CMT's 2002 special of their countdown of the 40 Greatest Women of Country Music.

In 2006, Womack announced plans of a sixth studio album off of Mercury Nashville Records. The lead single, "Finding My Way Back Home" was released in the late summer of that year and debuted at No. 46 on the Billboard Country Chart. The single later peaked at No. 37 and was rescheduled into 2007, because Womack found more songs that she wanted to record, however it was never released and Womack left Mercury.

In 2008, Womack announced plans for a new single for the first time in three years, once again on MCA Nashville. "Last Call" was released on June 30, 2008. It served as the lead-off single to Womack's seventh studio album, Call Me Crazy, which was released on October 21, 2008. The album, released on vinyl and CD, was produced by Tony Brown, has been described as a dark album with plenty of songs about drinking and losing love. It featured a duet with George Strait titled "Everything But Quits," a re-recording of the Strait song "The King of Broken Hearts," which first appeared on the Pure Country soundtrack. One track, "The Bees," features vocals from Keith Urban.

In October 2009, Womack released "There Is a God", as the lead-off single to her upcoming seventh studio album which never surfaced. The song debuted at No. 60 on the Billboard Hot Country Songs chart for the week of November 14, 2009, eventually peaking at No. 32 in early 2010. Womack has revealed a few of the tracks that she has recorded for the album, including: "Talking Behind Your Back", as well as "You Do Until You Don't".

In October 2010, Womack contributed the new track "Liars Lie" to the soundtrack for the film Country Strong. Womack also contributed guest vocals to Alan Jackson's cover of the song "Ring of Fire", which was released in December 2010 as a single from his compilation album, 34 Number Ones. His version of the song was a minor hit, charting to number 45 on the Hot Country Songs charts. Though Womack is featured on the song, she was not given credit on the charts.

In August 2012, Womack parted ways with MCA Nashville.

Americana transition, return to music, and subsequent material loss: 2014–present
In April 2014, Womack signed with Sugar Hill Records. Her first album for the label, The Way I'm Livin', was released September 23, 2014. Critics cheered the progressive traditionalist's return. In addition to a four out of four star review in USA Today, Rolling Stone proclaimed Livin' "feels like something Merle Haggard or Waylon Jennings would have crafted back in the Seventies," Spin deemed it "the best of her career" and Garden & Gun offered, "Nashville is filled with artists making 'the record they were born to make.'  With Livin', Womack is one of the few who actually deliver."

"Livin'" was the only country album to make Esquire magazine's Top Albums of 2014 list. It was nominated for two 2015 Grammy Awards for Best Country Album and for Best Engineered Album, Non-Classical.  Womack also received two Americana Music Awards nominations for Album of the Year and Artist of the Year and her first CMA Female Vocalist of the Year nomination in ten years.

On September 26, 2014, Womack collaborated with American R&B singer John Legend for an episode of CMT Crossroads. Ahead of her 2015 tour in support of The Way I'm Livin', Womack appeared at the C2C: Country to Country festival in the UK.

On August 15, 2017, Womack announced her new album The Lonely, the Lonesome & the Gone due on October 27 on ATO Records.

Personal life
At Belmont University, Womack met and married singer-songwriter Jason Sellers in 1990; they divorced in 1996. Together they had a daughter named Aubrie Sellers (b. February 1991). Womack gave birth to her second daughter, Anna Lise Liddell, in January 1999 after marrying record producer Frank Liddell.

Discography

Studio albums
 Lee Ann Womack (1997)
 Some Things I Know (1998)
 I Hope You Dance (2000)
 Something Worth Leaving Behind (2002)
 The Season for Romance (2002)
 There's More Where That Came From (2005)
 Call Me Crazy (2008)
 The Way I'm Livin' (2014)
 The Lonely, the Lonesome & the Gone'' (2017)

Awards and nominations
To date, Lee Ann Womack has won 6 CMA Awards (from 17 nominations), 5 ACM Awards (from 16 nominations) and 1 Grammy (from 14 nominations).

Television appearances

Filmography

References

External links
 
 

1966 births
20th-century American guitarists
20th-century American singers
20th-century American women guitarists
20th-century American women singers
21st-century American singers
21st-century American women singers
American country singer-songwriters
American country guitarists
American women country singers
ATO Records artists
Belmont University alumni
Country musicians from Tennessee
Country musicians from Texas
Country pop musicians
Decca Records artists
Grammy Award winners
Living people
MCA Records artists
Mercury Records artists
People from Jacksonville, Texas
Sugar Hill Records artists
Singers from Nashville, Tennessee
Singer-songwriters from Texas
South Plains College alumni
Tennessee Republicans
Texas Republicans
Singer-songwriters from Tennessee